La Grand-Messe is the sixth album by Québécois néo-trad band Les Cowboys Fringants.

Track listing
Intro (Lépine) - 1:05
Les étoiles filantes (Pauzé) - 4:25
Ti-cul  (Pauzé) - 3:08
8 secondes (Pauzé) - 4:05
Plus rien (Pauzé) - 3:37
Hannah (Pauzé, Lépine, Dupras) - 5:24
Symphonie pour Caza  (Pauzé) - 5:36
La reine (Pauzé) - 2:50
En attendant/Le reel de nos gens (Pauzé/Lépine) - 4:49
Lettre à Lévesque (Pauzé) - 3:46
Ces temps-ci (Pauzé) - 3:59
Ma belle Sophie (Lépine) - 3:31
Shish taouk (Les Cowboys Fringants) - 1:42
Camping Ste-Germaine (Pauzé) - 3:35
Si la vie vous intéresse (Pauzé, Lépine) - 5:55
Épilogue: Si tu penses un peu comme ça (Pauzé, Lebeau) - 4:52

Booklet

Special notes
 Album composed at L'Assomption between January and August 2004
 Arranged between Saint-Charles-de-Mandeville and Montreal winter-autumn-summer 2004
 Recorded between June and October 2004 Studio 270, in Outremont

Additional credits
 Strings arrangement: Marie-Annick Lépine
 Brass section arrangement: J-F Pauzé1, D. Jespersen, I. Jolicoeur
 Musical arrangement: Each cowboys do their own arrangements
 Realization: Les Cowboys Fringants and Robert Langlois
 Sound: Robert Langlois
 Mixing: Robert Langlois
 Mastering: Jim Rabchuck, Audiobec
 Cover concept: Colette Beaudin and Valérie Dupras
 Graphics: Jo-Anne Bolduc
 Guest star: Vincent Caza

Guest musician
 Ivanhoe Jolicoeur: Trumpet, Flügelhorn
 David Jespersen: Quoted as the 4th best trombone player in Quebec.

References

Les Cowboys Fringants albums
2004 albums